Francis George Howard  (b Grantchester 5 December 1843 - d Cambridge 10 December 1889) was Censor of Fitzwilliam House, Cambridge from 1881 until his death.

Howard was educated at St Paul's and Trinity College, Cambridge. He was ordained a priest in the Church of England in 1867. After a curacy in Grantchester he was Chaplain to the non collegiate students from 1871 until his appointment as Censor.

References 

People educated at Westminster School, London
Alumni of Trinity College, Cambridge
Censors of Fitzwilliam House, Cambridge
People from Grantchester
1949 deaths
1872 births